Lee Suk-jae (born 8 July 2003) is a South Korean footballer currently playing as a midfielder for Havant & Waterlooville.

Career
Born in Seoul, Lee moved to Portsmouth as a child, playing for a number of teams locally before joining Portsmouth on a two-year scholarship in 2019. He made his senior debut on 10 November 2020 in an EFL Trophy match against West Ham United U21, also playing in the same competition against Cheltenham Town the following month. Lee turned down the offer of a professional contract from Pompey at the end of the season and left the club. After trials with Sunderland and Brentford, he joined Gosport Borough in November 2021. On 15 April 2022, he joined Havant & Waterlooville. He joined Salisbury on dual registration in August 2022.

Career statistics

References

2003 births
Living people
Footballers from Seoul
South Korean footballers
Association football midfielders
National League (English football) players
Southern Football League players
Portsmouth F.C. players
Gosport Borough F.C. players
Havant & Waterlooville F.C. players
Salisbury F.C. players
Expatriate footballers in England
South Korean expatriate footballers
South Korean expatriate sportspeople in England